FK Bačinci is a defunct football club based in Bačinci, Vojvodina, Serbia. They achieved their best results under the sponsorship name Big Bull, before merging with Radnički Šid in 2010.

History
In the NATO bombing-shortened 1998–99 season, the club finished second in the Serbian League Vojvodina and earned promotion to the Second League of FR Yugoslavia. They spent the next four years in the second tier (Group North), being relegated back to the Serbian League Vojvodina in 2003. Later on, the club participated in the 2008–09 Serbian Cup, being eliminated to Vojvodina in the first round. They subsequently won the Serbian League Vojvodina in the 2009–10 season. In June 2010, the club merged with Radnički Šid to compete under the name Big Bull Radnički in the 2010–11 Serbian First League.

Honours
Serbian League Vojvodina (Tier 3)
 2009–10

Managerial history

References

External links
 Club page at Srbijasport

1963 establishments in Serbia
2010 disestablishments in Serbia
Association football clubs disestablished in 2010
Association football clubs established in 1963
Defunct football clubs in Serbia
Football clubs in Vojvodina